For the Winter Olympics, there are 19 venues that have or will host bobsleigh. Initially the only sliding sport for the Winter Games, it was first combined with luge in 1976. It has been that way since 1984 and skeleton since 2002.

References

Venues
 
Bobsleigh